Rib Lake is a town in Taylor County, Wisconsin, United States. The population was 768 at the 2000 census. The village of Rib Lake is completely surrounded by the town.

History
Most of the edges of the six by six squares that would become Rib Lake were surveyed in October 1861 by a crew working for the U.S. government. In early 1862, the same crew marked all the section corners in the township, walking through the woods and swamps, measuring with chain and compass. When done, the deputy surveyor filed this general description for the six by six square that now contains the village of Rib Lake:
The Surface of this Township is generally rolling.  Soil Fair 2nd Rate and good for agricultural purposes.  Timber Hemlock Birch Sugar and White Pine of good quality.  It is well watered by numerous Small Lakes and Streams of pure water.

The area was logged from the 1880s on, with a large mill on the banks of Rib Lake. Bark from the hemlock mentioned above was another important early product, supplying the tannery in the village of Rib Lake.  A good portion of the town is still forest, much of it Taylor County Forest.

Rustic Road #1, a scenic drive that winds over hills and around lakes and Wisconsin's first official Rustic Road, was dedicated in 1975.

Geography
According to the United States Census Bureau, the town has a total area of 74.9 square miles (193.9 km2), of which 74.0 square miles (191.7 km2) is land and 0.9 square miles (2.2 km2) (1.14%) is water.

Much of Rib Lake is hilly, with small glacial lakes. It lies within the Perkinstown terminal moraine, which is described under Taylor County.

Demographics

At the 2000 census, there were 768 people, 278 households and 212 families residing in the town. The population density was 10.4 per square mile (4.0/km2).  There were 466 housing units at an average density of 6.3 per square mile (2.4/km2). The racial makeup of the town was 98.31% White, 0.13% Native American, 1.17% Asian, 0.13% from other races, and 0.26% from two or more races.  0.52% of the population were Hispanic or Latino of any race.

There were 278 households, of which 33.5% had children under the age of 18 living with them, 66.9% were married couples living together, 6.8% had a female householder with no husband present, and 23.4% were non-families. 20.9% of all households were made up of individuals, and 8.3% had someone living alone who was 65 years of age or older. The average household size was 2.66 and the average family size was 3.08.

27.2% of the population were under the age of 18, 5.9% from 18 to 24, 27.3% from 25 to 44, 23.2% from 45 to 64, and 16.4% who were 65 years of age or older. The median age was 39 years. For every 100 females, there were 116.3 males. For every 100 females age 18 and over, there were 110.2 males.

The median household income was $38,393, and the median family income was $43,295. Males had a median income of $29,250 versus $21,103 for females. The per capita income for the town was $15,641. About 4.8% of families and 9.7% of the population were below the poverty line, including 12.4% of those under age 18 and 3.5% of those age 65 or over.

See also

Big Rib River
History of Wisconsin, Logging
Ice Age Trail

References

External links
 Camp Forest Springs Bible Camp on James Lake.

Towns in Taylor County, Wisconsin
Towns in Wisconsin